Avani Lekhara (born 8 November 2001) is an Indian Paralympian and rifle shooter. She won a Gold Medal in 10m air rifle standing and a Bronze Medal in 50m rifle 3 positions at Tokyo 2020 Paralympics. , Lekhara is ranked world no. 1 in Women's 10m Air Rifle standing SH1 (World Shooting Para Sport Rankings) and has competed in the 2018 Asian Para Games. She has been supported by GoSports Foundation through the Para Champions Programme. She is also the first Indian woman to win multiple medals in a single Paralympic Games. She has been given out of turn appointment as Assistant Conservator of Forest (ACF) by the Government of Rajasthan.

Career

Lekhara is the first Indian woman to win a Paralympic gold medal. Lekhara also won India's first gold medal at the 2020 Summer Paralympics. With a score of 249.6 points in the final event, the young shooter set a Paralympic record and tied the world record. She began shooting in 2015, inspired by former Olympic champion Abhinav Bindra and has since won several national and international titles. On 3 September 2021, she became the first Indian female Paralympian to win two medals in Paralympics history after claiming bronze in women's 50m air rifle standing event.

Personal life
A car accident in 2012, at the age of 11, left her with complete paraplegia. Her father encouraged her to join sports, training in archery but moving to shooting in which she found her true passion. She currently studies law in Rajasthan, India. She was student of Kendriya Vidyalaya 3 (Jaipur), where she received her first gold medal in regional match of shooting.

Awards
 2021 – Khel Ratna Award, highest sporting honour of India.
 2021 - Young Indian of the Year - GQ India
 2021 - Vogue Women of the Year - Vogue Magazine
 2021 - Best Female Debut - Paralympic Awards - International Paralympic Committee 
 2022 - Padma Shri
 2022 - FICCI FLO Award for Excellence in Sports
 2022 - She - Age Award by Hindustan Times
 2022 - Para Athlete of the Year (Female) - Sportstar
 2022 - BBC India Change Maker Of The Year 2021 
 2022 - BRICS CCI WE - Trailblazer 2022

See also
Paralympic Committee of India
 India at the Paralympics

References

2001 births
Living people
Indian female sport shooters
Paralympic shooters of India
Shooting sports in India
Indian sportswomen
People from Rajasthan
Sportspeople from Jaipur
Shooters at the 2020 Summer Paralympics
Paralympic gold medalists for India
Paralympic bronze medalists for India
Medalists at the 2020 Summer Paralympics
Paralympic medalists in shooting
Recipients of the Khel Ratna Award
Recipients of the Padma Shri in sports